Parastenolechia formosana is a moth of the family Gelechiidae. It is found in Taiwan.

References

Moths described in 1991
Parastenolechia